Alphonsa Matriculation Higher Secondary School is a co-educational institution situated in Alphonsa Nagar, Nagercoil, Kanyakumari, Tamil Nadu, India. 

The school was started in 1990. The school is run by the Syro-Malabar Catholic Diocese of Thuckalay. Bishop Mar George Rajendran SDB is the Chairman of the Management Board. The Parish Priest of St. Alphonsa Church, Nagercoil, Rev. Fr. Sanil John Panthichirackal, is the Correspondent of the school. Rev. Sr. Lizbeth is the Principal. This school is recognized by the Govt. of Tamil Nadu and follows the State Board syllabus of Tamil Nadu in collaboration with XSEED Education. The teaching faculty is led by the sisters of the Franciscan Clarist Congregation. At present, the school has classes from Kindergarten to Grade 12.

See also 
 List of Christian Schools in India
 List of Schools in India

References

Syro-Malabar Catholic Church
Primary schools in Tamil Nadu
High schools and secondary schools in Tamil Nadu
Christian schools in Tamil Nadu
Schools in Kanyakumari district
Education in Nagercoil
Educational institutions established in 1947
1947 establishments in India